The 1952 United States presidential election in Arizona took place on November 4, 1952, as part of the 1952 United States presidential election. State voters chose four representatives, or electors, to the Electoral College, who voted for president and vice president.

Arizona was won by Columbia University President Dwight D. Eisenhower (R–New York), running with California Senator Richard Nixon, with 58.35% of the popular vote, against Adlai Stevenson (D–Illinois), running with Alabama Senator John Sparkman, with 41.65% of the popular vote.

With his win in the state, Eisenhower became the first Republican presidential candidate since Herbert Hoover in 1928 to win the state, or to even carry any counties.

This election would signal the beginning of a long Republican dominance in elections in Arizona;  Republicans would go on to carry the state in every single presidential election except 1996 and 2020, and would maintain control of at least one of the state's Senate seats until the latter election.

Results

Results by county

References

Arizona
1952
1952 Arizona elections